Forbidden Love is a 1920 German silent film directed by Erik Lund.

Cast
 Esther Hagan
 Bruno Kastner

References

Bibliography

External links

1920 films
Films of the Weimar Republic
German silent feature films
Films directed by Erik Lund
German black-and-white films
1920s German films